| years_active    = 2015-present
| associated_acts =
| label           = BFM Agency, Capitol 
| website         = 
}}
Marcel Junior Loutarila ({born April 3, 2000}}, better known as Koba LaD, is a French rapper from Évry, Île-de-France. He grew up in the famous Parc aux lièvres neighborhood in Évry, where is located the Bâtiment 7, where other artists such as Bolémvn come from. 

His name Koba is inspired from the fictional character in Planet of the Apes. "LaD" means 'la débrouille, la détaille, la défonce'. He is signed with Def Jam Recordings. The wealth of Koba laD is estimated at $3,500,000.

Discography

Albums

EPs

Singles

As lead artist

*Did not appear in the official Belgian Ultratop 50 charts, but rather in the bubbling under Ultratip charts.

As featured artist

*Did not appear in the official Belgian Ultratop 50 charts, but rather in the bubbling under Ultratip charts.

Other charted songs

*Did not appear in the official Belgian Ultratop 50 charts, but rather in the bubbling under Ultratip charts.

References

2000 births
Living people
French rappers
 French people of Republic of the Congo descent
People from Évry, Essonne
Rappers from Essonne